Cross-country skiing at the 2018 Winter Paralympics was held at the Alpensia Biathlon Centre, South Korea. The twenty events were held from 11 to 18 March 2018. Canadian Brian McKeever won three individual gold and a team relay bronze, his third triple gold medal performance, for a career total of 13 gold medals and 17 medals in all, making him the most decorated Paralympic cross-country skier ever.

Events

The program includes 20 events. The events are mostly divided into three classifications (sitting, standing and visually impaired). For each of these classifications, there are three men's events and three women's events. There are also two relay events which combine classifications. Standing skiers are those that have a locomotive disability but are able to use the same equipment as able-bodied skiers, whereas sitting competitors use a sitski. Skiers with a visual impairment compete with the help of a sighted guide. The skier with the visual impairment and the guide are considered a team, and dual medals are awarded.

Men's events
 1.1 km / 1.5 km sprint (all three classifications)
 7.5 km (sitting) / 10 km (standing and visually impaired)
 15 km (sitting) / 20 km (standing and visually impaired)

Women's events
 1.1 km / 1.5 km sprint (all three classifications)
 5 km (sitting) / 7.5 km (standing and visually impaired)
 12 km (sitting) / 15 km (standing and visually impaired)

Relay events
 4 x 2.5 km mixed relay (combined)
 4 x 2.5 km open relay (combined)

Competition schedule
The following is the competition schedule for all twenty events.

All times are local (UTC+9).

Medal summary

Medal table

Women's events

Men's events

Relay events

See also
Cross-country skiing at the 2018 Winter Olympics
 Multi-Medallists - cross-country  IPC – Official website

References

External links
Official Results Book – Cross-Country Skiing

 
2018 Winter Paralympics
2018 Winter Paralympics events
Paralympics
Cross-country skiing competitions in South Korea